Craig Ralph Wood (November 18, 1901 – May 7, 1968) was an American professional golfer in the 1930s and 1940s, the winner of 21 PGA Tour titles including two major championships and a member of three Ryder Cup teams .

Wood was the first player to lose all four major championships in extra holes. His major wins came late in his career at age 39, winning the first two of 1941, the Masters and U.S. Open.

Playing career
Born in Lake Placid, New York, Wood turned professional in 1920 at age 18. Despite his two major championships, he is probably most well known as the victim of Gene Sarazen's famous double eagle in the 1935 Augusta National Invitational (now known as the Masters Tournament). The shot left the two players tied at the end of regulation and Sarazen went on to victory in a 36-hole playoff.

This was the fourth runner-up and third playoff loss for Wood in a major in just two years. In the 1933 British Open at St Andrews, Denny Shute had defeated Wood in another 36-hole playoff. In the spring of 1934, Wood was the runner up by a single shot to Horton Smith at the first Masters and later that year he was defeated on the 38th hole by Paul Runyan in the PGA Championship, then a match play event.  At the 1939 U.S. Open he birdied the 72nd hole and was again in a playoff, but this time Byron Nelson was the winner, making Wood the first player to lose all four major championships in extra holes. Greg Norman is the only other player to suffer this fate.

At age 39 in 1941, Wood finally beat his "jinx" in noteworthy fashion. He won the eighth 1941 Masters Tournament in April, its first wire-to-wire champion with rounds of 66-71-71-72=280 for a three-shot victory over runner-up Byron Nelson. Two months later, he won the 45th U.S. Open, held at Colonial Country Club in Fort Worth, Texas. His score of 284 (+4) was three strokes ahead of Denny Shute, another on-course nemesis. This was the first time the winner of the Masters had won the U.S. Open in the same year for the first half of the grand slam. Subsequent winners of the first two majors were Ben Hogan (1951, 1953), Arnold Palmer (1960), Jack Nicklaus (1972), Tiger Woods (2002), and Jordan Spieth (2015).

In 1954, the Lake Placid Golf and Country Club changed its name to the "Craig Wood Golf Course" in honor of its native son.

Death
Wood died in Palm Beach, Florida in 1968 at age 66, of a heart attack. He was the second Masters champion to die, preceded by Horton Smith in 1963 and followed by Jimmy Demaret in 1983.  Wood and his wife   are buried in North Elba, New York, just south of Lake Placid. He was elected to the World Golf Hall of Fame in 2008 on the PGA Tour ballot.

Professional wins (28)

PGA Tour wins (21)
1928 (1) New Jersey PGA Championship
1929 (2) Oklahoma City Open, Hawaiian Open
1930 (2) New Jersey PGA Championship, Reddy Tee Tournament
1931 (1) Harlingen Open
1932 (3) New Jersey PGA Match Play Championship, San Francisco National Match Play Open, Pasadena Open
1933 (2) Los Angeles Open, Radium Springs Open
1934 (2) Galveston Open Championship, New Jersey Open
1936 (1) General Brock Open
1938 (1) Augusta Open-Forest Hills
1940 (2) Metropolitan Open, Miami Biltmore International Four-Ball (with Billy Burke)
1941 (2) Masters Tournament, U.S. Open
1942 (1) Canadian Open
1944 (1) Durham Open

Major championships are shown in bold.

Other wins (7)
Note: This list may be incomplete.
1925 Kentucky Open
1926 Kentucky PGA Championship
1929 Pasadena Open (January)
1934 Lakes Open
1938 New Jersey PGA Championship
1942 Metropolitan PGA Championship
1943 Golden Valley Four-Ball (with Jimmy Demaret)

Major championships

Wins (2)

Results timeline

NYF = tournament not yet founded
NT = no tournament
WD = withdrew
DQ = disqualified
CUT = missed the half-way cut
R64, R32, R16, QF, SF = Round in which player lost in PGA Championship match play
"T" indicates a tie for a place

Summary

Most consecutive cuts made – 21 (1934 PGA – 1944 PGA)
Longest streak of top-10s – 4 (1939 Masters – 1940 U.S. Open)

See also
List of golfers with most PGA Tour wins
List of men's major championships winning golfers

References

External links

PGA of America: Metropolitan Section – Craig Wood
GolfCompendium.com – Craig Wood
Craig Wood Golf Club – Lake Placid / North Elba, New York

American male golfers
PGA Tour golfers
Ryder Cup competitors for the United States
Winners of men's major golf championships
World Golf Hall of Fame inductees
Golfers from New York (state)
People from Lake Placid, New York
1901 births
1968 deaths